The 2017 Tour de Langkawi was the 22nd edition of an annual professional road bicycle racing stage race held in Malaysia since 1996. The race was run at the highest category apart from those races which make up the UCI World Tour, and was rated by the Union Cycliste Internationale (UCI) as a 2.HC (hors category) race as part of the 2017 UCI Asia Tour.

He won the race by 33 seconds ahead of Australia's Cameron Bayly, while the podium was completed by Italian rider Alberto Cecchin, a further two seconds behind for the  squad.

Teams

19 teams accepted invitations to participate in the 2017 Tour de Langkawi. One UCI WorldTeam –  was invited to the race, along with six UCI Professional Continental and eleven UCI Continental teams. The field was completed by one national selection teams. Each team had a maximum of six riders:

Route
The itinerary for the race was released on 22 December 2016.

Stages

Stage 1
22 February 2017 — Kuala Berang to Kuala Terengganu,

Stage 2
23 February 2017 — Jerteh to Gerik,

Stage 3
24 February 2017 — Serdang to Pantai Remis,

Stage 4
25 February 2017 — Seri Manjung to Cameron Highlands,

Stage 5
26 February 2017 — Meru Raya to Kuala Kubu Bharu,

Stage 6
27 February 2017 — Senawang to Muar,

Stage 7
28 February 2017 — Malacca to Rembau,

Stage 8
1 March 2017 — Setiawangsa to Putrajaya,

Classification leadership table
In the 2017 Tour de Langkawi, four different jerseys were awarded. For the general classification, calculated by adding each cyclist's finishing times on each stage, and allowing time bonuses for the first three finishers at intermediate sprints and at the finish of mass-start stages, the leader received a yellow jersey. This classification was considered the most important of the 2017 Tour de Langkawi, and the winner of the classification was considered the winner of the race.

Additionally, there was a points classification, which awarded a blue jersey. In the points classification, cyclists received points for finishing in the top 10 in a mass-start stage. For winning a stage, a rider earned 15 points, with 12 for second, 9 for third, 7 for fourth with a point fewer per place down to a single point for 10th place. Points towards the classification could also be accrued at intermediate sprint points during each stage; these intermediate sprints also offered bonus seconds towards the general classification. There was also a mountains classification, the leadership of which was marked by a green and red jersey. In the mountains classification, points were won by reaching the top of a climb before other cyclists, with more points available for the higher-categorised climbs.

The fourth jersey represented the Asian rider classification, marked by a white jersey. This was decided in the same way as the general classification, but only riders from Asia were eligible to be ranked in the classification. There was also a classification for teams, in which the times of the best three cyclists in a team on each stage were added together; the leading team at the end of the race was the team with the lowest cumulative time, while there was also an Asian-only variant for the teams as well.

Final standings

General classification

Points classification

Mountains classification

Asian rider classification

Team classification

Asian team classification

Riders who failed to finish

References

External links

2017
2017 UCI Asia Tour
2017 in Malaysian sport